Keith Victor Fahnhorst (February 6, 1952 – June 12, 2018) was a National Football League (NFL) offensive lineman from 1974 through 1987. Fahnhorst, a 273-pound, 6-foot-6-inch lineman from the University of Minnesota, led the San Francisco 49ers in seniority and appeared in Super Bowl XVI and Super Bowl XIX games. 
 
Fahnhorst's younger brother Jim Fahnhorst played linebacker in the USFL and for the 49ers from 1984 to 1990. The brothers were teammates on the 1984 49ers team that won Super Bowl XIX and finished with a 15-1 record.

Personal life

Fahnhorst married Susan Kluska in 1974.  They had three daughters, Tiffany, Brittney, and Courtney.  Tiffany is a financial advisor in Minnesota. Courtney is a doctor in Jacksonville, FL.

Fahnhorst retired from pro football because of a neck injury that caused him to miss nine games during the 1987 season. He moved to Minneapolis to work as a stockbroker.

Fahnhorst received a life-saving kidney transplant in 2003.

Fahnhorst died June 12, 2018 at the age 66.

References

External links
 Keith Fahnhorst Stats

1952 births
2018 deaths
Sportspeople from St. Cloud, Minnesota
Businesspeople from Minneapolis
Players of American football from Minnesota
American football offensive tackles
Minnesota Golden Gophers football players
San Francisco 49ers players
National Conference Pro Bowl players
20th-century American businesspeople